Klese Haas (born 2 March 2002) is an Australian professional rugby league footballer who plays as a  forward for the Gold Coast Titans in the NRL.

Background
Haas’s brother Payne Haas, plays for the Brisbane Broncos. He’s the nephew of former Newcastle forward Mark Taufua. Haas moved to Gold Coast, Queensland, at 10 years old meaning he's eligible for Queensland instead of New South Wales who is brother Payne has played for. Haas played his junior footy for Nerang Roosters and Biambil Jets.

Playing Career
In round 24 of the 2022 NRL season, Haas made his debut for the Gold Coast against the Newcastle Knights.

References

External links
Gold Coast Titans profile

2002 births
Australian rugby league players
Rugby league second-rows
Gold Coast Titans players
Living people
Rugby league players from Gold Coast, Queensland